Sami Mohammad Ali Said Jaff (1968-2007), also known as Abu Omar al-Kurdi, was a bomb-maker for Abu Musab al-Zarqawi.

Biography 
Abu Omar al-Kurdi was an ethnic Kurd from the Jaff tribe. He was a veteran of Jihad in Afghanistan, where he allegedly mastered his bomb-making skills. He returned to Iraq in 2003 where he met Zarqawi and would later become his top bomb-maker. Allegedly, al-Kurdi's bomb-making was made possible by using hundreds of rockets and explosives stolen from Iraqi military warehouses by another member, Ammar az-Zubaidi, early in the 2003 invasion of Iraq. By the time he was arrested on January 15, 2005, he was already responsible for 75 percent of the car bomb attacks in Iraq since August 2003 but only confessed to 32 of them. These included the attack on the Jordanian embassy, the Canal Hotel bombing, the Imam Ali mosque bombing, the attack on the Italian base in Nasiriyya and the attack that killed Ezzedine Salim. The authorities said that al-Kurdi planned attacks on election polling stations during the January 30, 2005 parliamentary elections. al-Kurdi was executed in Baghdad in 2007.

See also 

 Mullah Shwan Kurdi

References 

1968 births
2007 deaths
Deaths by firearm in Iraq
Kurdish Islamists
Fugitives
Fugitives wanted by Iraq
Members of al-Qaeda in Iraq
Salafi jihadists
Kurdish people